Helene Christaller (née Heyer: 31 January 1872, in Darmstadt – 24 May 1953, in Jugenheim/Bergstraße) was a German Protestant writer mostly of youth books, especially for girls. During the Nazi-Era her books were not printed because of their Christian tenor.

Literary works 
 Gottfried Erdmann, 1908
 Heilige Liebe, 1911
 Verborgenheit, 1920
 Das Tagebuch der Annette, 1926
 Ein gefülltes Leben, 1939
 Eine Lebensgeschichte, 1942

External links 
 
 

German women writers
1872 births
1953 deaths